Short program and similar can mean:
Short program (figure skating), part of a figure skating competition
Short Program (manga), a Japanese manga series by Mitsuru Adachi
Short Program, a live-action drama series adaptation of the manga starring members of JO1